The Gugars were a people of Caucasian Iberia, settling near the Debeda river, mentioned by Strabo.

They were presumably an early Georgian (Kartvelian) people  (Georgian: გუგარები, gugarebi). 

The toponym Gogarene, an integral part of Caucasian Iberia, is derived from their name.  The region is first mentioned by Strabo who records it as a province of Iberia. Later it was renamed Gugark, after the conquests of Arshakid Armenian rulers in the 2nd century BC.

References
 Georgian Soviet Encyclopedia, vol. 3, pg. 289, Tb., 1978
 Iv. Javakhishvili, Introduction to the History of the Georgian Nation, Book 1 — Ethnological and historical problems of Georgia, Caucasus and the Middle East, Tb., 1950;
 D. Muskhelishvili,Georgian Soviet Encyclopedia, Vol. 3, pg. 196, Tbilisi., 1978

Ancient peoples of Georgia (country)